After the collision of two trains near Tempi, Greece on 28 February 2023, protests broke out across Greece. Several thousand people participated in vigils, protests, or riots in response to the perceived lack of safety measures. Railway unions declared strikes in protest of Greece's government failing to modernize the rail system.

In response to both the tragedy and the growing dissatisfaction of the industry in general, the Panhellenic Union of Railway Personnel walked out in protest of working conditions and the lack of modernization of the railway network, beginning the strike on 2 March 2023, despite the fact that the STASY subway workers union had called off the planned strike in the Athens subway out of respect for the victims of the previous day. Fights broke out in Athens, with police firing teargas into the crowd that gathered in front of the Hellenic Train headquarters building. On 7 March, students walked out of class, closing many schools in Thessaloniki, forcing schools to move to online classes via Webex for a couple of days. The Confederation of Public Servants of Greece (ADEDY) called a 24-hour general strike for 8 March 2023.

References 

Protests in Greece
2023 protests
February 2023 events in Greece
March 2023 events in Greece